Millersview is an unincorporated community in Concho County, Texas, United States. The town is the only one in the United States named Millersview.

History
The settlement was named for Edward D. Miller, who co-founded the town with Henry Barr. It was granted a post office in 1903 which was still open as of 2020. After the population dropped to 70 in 1970 it remained around this level for the next 30 years. Several historic buildings still stand today, including the school's former gym, which is still active as a community center, though the neighboring former schoolhouse (no longer in use by 1989) has fallen into dilapidation.

Demographics

References

External links
 

Unincorporated communities in Texas
Unincorporated communities in Concho County, Texas